The London Clinic is a private healthcare organisation and registered charity based on the corner of Devonshire Place and Marylebone Road in central London. According to HealthInvestor, it is one of England's largest private hospitals.

History
The London Clinic was established by a group of Harley Street doctors; the building was designed by Charles Henry Biddulph-Pinchard and officially opened by the Duchess of York in 1932.

Queen Elizabeth II opened a new cancer centre, built at a cost of £80 million, at the London Clinic in April 2010.

After an inspection in December 2014 by the Food Standards Agency the organisation was given only two stars - the only hospital in London to perform so poorly - but the poor standard of hygiene was addressed and, after a further inspection in June 2015, the Clinic was awarded five stars.

In November 2015 it secured a £65 million revolving credit facility from HSBC which was used to increase theatre capacity, boost technology investment and renovate the radiology and intensive care facilities.

In November 2017 the Care Quality Commission described the design of the new intensive care unit and the annual multi-faith memorial service, which contributes to end of life services, as areas of "outstanding practice".

The clinic opened a specialist centre for robotic surgery in 2019.

Notable patients
 Clement Attlee: The Leader of the Opposition was admitted to the clinic for a prostatectomy in September 1939.
 David Cameron: The Prime Minister of the United Kingdom was born in clinic at October 1966.
Emma Walton Hamilton: The British children's book author and eldest daughter of English actress Julie Andrews was born in clinic in November 1962.
 John F. Kennedy: The American congressman was diagnosed with Addison's disease at the clinic in September 1947.
 Sir Anthony Eden: The Foreign Secretary went into the London Clinic for a cholecystectomy in April 1953.
 Adnan Menderes: The Prime Minister of Turkey recovered in the London Clinic after being involved in an air crash in February 1959.
 Elizabeth Taylor: In January 1963, the actress underwent an operation on her knee at the clinic.
 Princess Margaret, Countess of Snowdon: The Queen's younger sister had an operation to remove a benign skin lesion in the clinic in January 1980. 
 Augusto Pinochet: It was at the London Clinic that General Augusto Pinochet, the former dictator of Chile, was arrested in October 1998 for crimes against humanity on the basis of an international arrest warrant.
 Wendy Richard: The actress died at the clinic on 26 February 2009 aged 65, where she was being treated for breast cancer.
 Prince Philip, Duke of Edinburgh: The Duke of Edinburgh was admitted to the clinic for 'abdominal investigations' in June 2013.
 Cecil Parkinson: The former Conservative Party chairman and cabinet minister died at the clinic on 22 January 2016 aged 84, where he was being treated for cancer of the colon.

See also
List of hospitals in England

References

External links
 The London Clinic website

 CQC inspection results for The London Clinic

Buildings and structures in the City of Westminster
Health charities in the United Kingdom
Health in the City of Westminster
Private hospitals in the United Kingdom
Harley Street
Hospitals in London